The following list is a discography of production by J Dilla (previously credited as Jay Dee), an American hip hop record producer and recording artist from Detroit, Michigan. It includes a list of songs produced, co-produced and remixed by year, artist, album and title.

Singles produced

Albums produced

1994

Da Enna C - Throw Ya Hands in the Air VLS 

 "Now (Freestyle Session)"

Da Enna C - True To Rap EP 

 "True To Rap" Remix (produced with DJ Dez)
 "Pack Da House"

1995

Poe - Hello 

 8. "Fingertips" (additional production with RJ Rice and Lionel Cole)

The Pharcyde - Labcabincalifornia 

 1. "Bullshit"
 4. "Runnin'"
 6. "Splattitorium"
 7. "Somethin' That Means Somethin'"
 9. "Drop"
 11. "Y?" (produced with Bootie Brown)

The Pharcyde - Drop (VLS) 

 B1. "Runnin' (Jay Dee Remix)"
 B2. "Y? (Be Like That) (Jay Dee Remix)"

1st Down - A Day wit the Homiez (VLS) 

 A2. "A Day wit the Homiez (Main Version)"
 B2. "Front Street (Main Version)"

Little Indian - One Little Indian (VLS) 

 A3. "One Little Indian (Jaydee's *hit Remix)"

1996

Proof - Anywhere EP 

 B2. "Vibe Session (Part 1)"

Mad Skillz - From Where??? 

 2. "It's Goin' Down"
 11. "The Jam"

Busta Rhymes - The Coming 

 10. "Still Shining"
 11. "Keep It Movin'" (featuring Leaders of the New School)

Busta Rhymes - Woo Hah!! Got You All in Check (VLS) 

 A3. "Woo Hah!! Got You All in Check (The Jay-Dee Bounce Remix)"
 B4. "Woo Hah!! Got You All in Check (The Jay-Dee Other Shit Remix)"

Busta Rhymes - It's a Party (VLS) 

 A3. "It's a Party (The Ummah Remix)" (featuring Zhané)
 B2. "Ill Vibe (The Ummah Remix)" (featuring Q-Tip)

De La Soul - Stakes Is High 

 16. "Stakes Is High" (produced with De La Soul)

De La Soul - Itzsoweezee (Hot) (VLS) 

 B1. "Stakes Is High (Remix)" (featuring Mos Def and Truth Enola)

The Pharcyde - She Said (VLS) 

 A2. "She Said (Jay-Dee Remix)"

A Tribe Called Quest - Beats, Rhymes and Life 
(produced with The Ummah)

 2. "Get a Hold"
 7. "1nce Again" (featuring Tammy Lucas)
 10. "Keeping It Moving"
 14. "Word Play"
 15. "Stressed Out" (featuring Faith Evans)

Various Artists - Get on the Bus: Music from and Inspired by the Motion Picture 

 4. "The Remedy" (performed by A Tribe Called Quest featuring Common)

Various Artists - NFL Jams 

 3. "When the Cheering Stops" (performed by AZ, Ray Buchanan and Scott Galbraith) (produced with Rick St. Hilaire)
 9. "Game Day" (performed by Phife Dawg and Rodney Hampton)

Keith Murray - Enigma 

 6. "Dangerous Ground" (featuring 50 Grand)
 14. "The Rhyme (Remix)"

5-Elementz - Yester Years 

 1. "Searchin'"
 2. "Feed Back"
 3. "Janet Jacme"
 4. "Don't Stop"
 5. "Sun Flower"

1997

The Brand New Heavies - Sometimes CDS 

 2. "Sometimes (Ummah Remix)"

Slum Village - Fan-Tas-Tic (Vol. 1) 

 All tracks

Busta Rhymes - When Disaster Strikes... 

 5. "So Hardcore"

Janet Jackson - Got 'til It's Gone CDS 

 "Got 'til It's Gone (Ummah Jay Dee Revenge Mix)" (featuring Q-Tip)

A Tribe Called Quest - The Jam EP 

 3. "Mardi Gras at Midnight" (featuring Rah Digga)

Somethin' for the People - All I Do (VLS) 

 A1. "All I Do (Jay Dee's Shit! Mix)" (featuring Phife Dawg)

Crustation - Purple (CDS) 

 2. "Purple (A Tribe Called Quest Edit)" (produced with The Ummah)
 4. "Purple (A Tribe Called Quest Mix)" (produced with The Ummah)

1998

Mood - Snake Backs VLS 

 Secrets of the Sand (Remix)"

Funkmaster Flex - The Mix Tape, Vol. III 

 26. "That Shit" (performed by A Tribe Called Quest and Jay Dee)

Bizarre - Attack of the Weirdos 

 6. "Butterfly"

A Tribe Called Quest - The Love Movement 

 1. "Start It Up"
 2. "Find a Way"
 3. "Da Booty"
 4. "Steppin' It Up" (featuring Busta Rhymes and Redman)
 7. "4 Moms" (featuring Spanky)
 8. "His Name Is Mutty Ranks"
 11. "Busta's Lament"
 13. "Against the World"

5-Elementz - The Album Time Forgot 

 2. "Whutchawant"
 3. "Feed Back"
 4. "Rockshows"
 7. "Party Groove"
 8. "Janet Jacme"
 11. "E.G.O."
 12. "Don't Stop"
 14. "Searchin'"

N'Dea Davenport - Bullshittin''' (VLS) ===

 A1. "Bullshittin' (Remix)" (featuring Mos Def)

== 1999 ==

=== The Roots - Things Fall Apart ===

 6. "Dynamite!" (featuring Rehani Sayeed)

=== The Roots - You Got Me (CDS) ===

 3. "New Year's @ Jay Dee"

=== Heavy D - Heavy ===

 4. "Listen" (featuring Q-Tip)

=== Q-Tip - Amplified ===
(produced with Q-Tip)

 1. "Wait Up"
 2. "Higher"
 3. "Breathe and Stop"
 4. "Moving with U"
 5. "Let's Ride"
 6. "Things U Do"
 7. "All In"
 8. "Go Hard"
 10. "Vivrant Thing"
 12. "End of Time" (featuring Korn)
 13. "Do It, See It, Be It"

=== Phife Dawg - Bend Ova (VLS) ===

 B1. "Thought U Wuz Nice"

=== 5 Ela - 5-E Pt. 3 ===

 4. "You Ain't Fresh"
 6. "Ain't No Love (Dirty Love Mix)"

=== Phat Kat - Dedication to the Suckers (VLS) ===

 A1. "Dedication to the Suckers"
 A3. "Don't Nobody Care About Us"
 B1. "Microphone Master"

=== Nine Yards - Always Find a Way (VLS) ===

 B1. "Always Find a Way (Jay Dee Remix)"

== 2000 ==

=== Various Artists - The Hurricane soundtrack ===

 2. "Little Brother" (performed by Black Star)

=== D12 - The Underground E.P. ===

 8. "Cock and Squeeze"

=== Common - Like Water for Chocolate ===

 1. "Time Travelin' (A Tribute to Fela)" (featuring Vinia Mojica, Roy Hargrove and Femi Kuti) (produced with D'Angelo, Questlove, and James Poyser)
 2. "Heat"
 4. "Dooinit"
 5. "The Light"
 6. "Funky for You" (featuring Bilal and Jill Scott) (produced with James Poyser)
 7. "The Questions" (featuring Mos Def) (produced with James Poyser)
 8. "Time Travelin' (Reprise)" (produced with D'Angelo, Questlove, and James Poyser)
 10. "A Film Called (Pimp)" (featuring Bilal and MC Lyte)
 11. "Nag Champa (Afrodisiac for the World)"
 12. "Thelonius" (featuring Slum Village)
 13. "Payback Is a Grandmother"

=== Slum Village - Fantastic, Vol. 2 ===

 All tracks
 7. "Tell Me" (featuring D'Angelo) (produced with D'Angelo)
 15. "Once Upon a Time" (featuring Pete Rock) (produced with Pete Rock)

=== Busta Rhymes - Anarchy ===

 3. "Enjoy da Ride"
 7. "Live It Up"
 10. "Show Me What You Got"

=== J-88 - Best Kept Secret ===

 All tracks

=== De La Soul - Art Official Intelligence: Mosaic Thump ===

 5. "Thru Ya City" (featuring D.V. Alias Khrist)

=== Phife Dawg - Ventilation: Da LP ===

 8. "Bend Ova"
 11. "4 Horsemen (192 N' It)" (featuring Know Naim)

=== Guru - Guru's Jazzmatazz, Vol. 3: Streetsoul ===

 5. "Certified" (featuring Bilal)

=== Erykah Badu - Mama's Gun ===

 2. "Didn't Cha Know?" (produced with Erykah Badu)
 3. "My Life" (produced with Erykah Badu and James Poyser)
 8. "Kiss Me on My Neck (Hesi)" (produced with Erykah Badu and James Poyser)

=== Various Artists - Lyricist Lounge 2 ===

 6. "Let's Grow" (performed by Royce da 5'9")

=== The Brand New Heavies - Saturday Night (Jay Dee Remix) (VLS) ===

 A1. "Saturday Night (Jay Dee Remix)" (featuring Mos Def)

== 2001 ==

=== Bilal - 1st Born Second ===

 4. "Reminisce" (feat. Mos Def and Common)

=== Chino XL - I Told You So ===

 17. "Don't Say a Word"
 23. "How It Goes" (featuring Saafir)

=== Busta Rhymes - Genesis ===

 5. "Genesis"
 15. "Make It Hurt"

=== De La Soul - AOI: Bionix ===

 16. "Peer Pressure" (featuring B-Real and J Dilla)

== 2002 ==

=== Slum Village - Trinity (Past, Present and Future) ===

 10. "One"
 11. "Hoes"
 15. "Let's"

=== Talib Kweli - Quality ===

 12. "Where Do We Go" (featuring Res)
 13. "Stand to the Side" (featuring Novel and Vinia Mojica)

=== Busta Rhymes - It Ain't Safe No More ===

 2. "It Ain't Safe No More..." (featuring Meka)
 6. "What Up"
 7. "Turn Me Up Some"

=== Common - Electric Circus ===

 2. "Soul Power" (produced with Questlove and James Poyser)
 3. "Aquarius" (featuring Bilal) (produced with Questlove, James Poyser, and Pino Palladino)
 4. "Electric Wire Hustler Flower" (featuring Sonny Sandoval) (produced with James Poyser)
 7. "New Wave" (featuring Lætitia Sadier) (produced with Questlove and James Poyser)
 8. "Star *69 (PS With Love)" (featuring Bilal) (produced with Questlove and James Poyser)
 10. "Between Me, You and Liberation" (featuring Cee Lo Green) (produced with Questlove, James Poyser, and Pino Palladino)
 11. "I Am Music" (featuring Jill Scott) (produced with Questlove, James Poyser, Pino Palladino, and Jeff Lee Johnson)
 12. "Jimi Was a Rock Star" (featuring Erykah Badu) (produced with Questlove, James Poyser, Pino Palladino, and Jeff Lee Johnson)

== 2003 ==

=== Jay Dee - Vol. 2: Vintage ===

 All tracks

=== Jay Dee - Ruff Draft ===

 All tracks

=== Royce da 5'9'' - Build & Destroy: The Lost Sessions Part 1 ===

 12. "Life Goes On"

=== Frank n Dank - 48 Hrs ===

 All tracks

=== Jaylib - Champion Sound ===

 1. "L.A. to Detroit" (produced with Madlib)
 3. "Nowadayz"
 5. "The Red"
 7. "Raw Shit" (featuring Talib Kweli)
 9. "The Heist"
 11. "React" (featuring Quasimoto)
 13. "Strip Club" (featuring Quasimoto)
 14. "The Exclusive" (featuring Percee P)
 16. "Starz"
 18. "Raw Addict"
 20. "Pillz"

=== Daft Punk - Daft Club ===

 10. "Aerodynamic" (Slum Village remix)

== 2004 ==

=== DJ Cam - Liquid Hip Hop ===

 10. "Love Junkee" (J Dilla Remix) (featuring Cameo)

=== Proof - I Miss the Hip Hop Shop ===

 16. "Bring It 2 Me" (featuring Killa Khann)

=== Phat Kat - The Undeniable LP ===

 3. "Dedication 2004"
 9. "Destiny" (featuring Melanie Rutherford)
 11. "Big Booties"

=== Elzhi - Witness My Growth: The Mixtape '97-'04  ===

 4. "Days and Nights"
 18. "Concrete Eyes"
 19. "Love It Here"
 24. "Look at my Friends"

=== Amp Fiddler - Waltz of a Ghetto Fly  ===

 1. "Intro"
 7. "You Play Me" (produced with Amp Fiddler)
 13. "Waltz of a Ghetto Fly" (featuring George Clinton)

=== Slum Village - Detroit Deli (A Taste of Detroit) ===

 2. "Do You" (featuring MC Breed)

=== Oh No - The Disrupt ===

 3. "Move" (featuring Roc C)

=== De La Soul - The Grind Date ===

 2. "Verbal Clap"
 3. "Much More" (featuring Yummy Bingham and DJ Premier)
 13. "Shoomp" (featuring Sean Paul)

== 2005 ==

=== M.E.D. - Push Comes to Shove  ===

 5. "Push" (featuring J Dilla)
 12. "So Real"

=== Common - Be ===

 6. "Love Is…"
 11. "It's Your World (Part 1 & 2)" (produced with James Poyser and Karriem Riggins)

=== Slum Village - Prequel to a Classic  ===

 7. "It'z Your World" (featuring J Dilla and Kurupt)
 13. "Who Are We"

=== Lawless Element - Soundvision: In Stereo ===

 3. "The Shining" (produced with Young RJ)

=== Dwele - Some Kinda... ===

 11. "Keep On" (featuring Slum Village)

=== Steve Spacek - Space Shift ===

 2. "Dollar"

=== Talib Kweli - Right About Now: The Official Sucka Free Mix CD ===

 9. "Roll Off Me"

== 2006 ==

=== Bilal - Love for Sale ===

 Unknown tracks

=== J Dilla - Donuts ===

 All tracks

=== Ghostface Killah - Fishscale ===

 7. "Beauty Jackson"
 12. "Whip You With a Strap"

=== Papoose - The Boyz in the Hood ===

 14. "Psycho" (featuring Busta Rhymes and Cassidy)

=== Busta Rhymes - The Big Bang ===

 8. "You Can't Hold the Torch" (featuring Q-Tip and Chauncey Black)

=== Dabrye - Two/Three ===

 20. "Game Over" (featuring J Dilla and Phat Kat)

=== J Dilla - The Shining ===

 All tracks
 5. "Baby" (featuring Madlib and Guilty Simpson) (produced with Madlib)
 8. "Over the Breaks" (produced with Karriem Riggins)
 9. "Body Movin'" (featuring J. Rocc and Karriem Riggins) (produced with Karriem Riggins and J. Rocc)

=== The Roots - Game Theory ===

 1. "Dillatastic Vol Won(derful)"
 13. "Can't Stop This" (produced with The Roots and The Randy Watson Experience)

=== Four Tet - Remixes ===

 14. "As Serious as Your Life" (Jay Dee remix)

=== Stones Throw Records - Chrome Children ===

 2. "Clap Your Hands" (performed by Guilty Simpson)
 3. "Take It Back" (performed by Madlib)
 5. "Nothing Like This" (performed by J Dilla)

=== The Visionaries - We Are the Ones (We Have Been Waiting For) ===

 3. "All Right"

=== A.G. - Get Dirty Radio ===

 13. "Hip Hop Quotable" (featuring Aloe Blacc)

== 2007 ==

=== Ghostface Killah - Hidden Darts: Special Edition ===

 6. "Murda Goons"

=== Phat Kat - Carte Blanche ===

 1. "Nasty Ain't It?"
 3. "My Old Label"
 4. Cold Steel" (featuring Elzhi)
 9. "Game Time"
 14. "Don't Nobody Care About Us"
 15. "World Premier"
 16. "It Don't Get No Liver Than This" (featuring La Peace)

=== Skyzoo - Corner Store Classic ===

 18. "They Don't Want It" (featuring Torae, Yatta Barz, and Zeqway)

=== Common - Finding Forever ===

 9. "So Far to Go" (featuring D'Angelo)

=== Guilty Simpson - Stray Bullets  ===

 16. "La La"
 23. "Man's World"

=== Busta Rhymes - Dilla-gence ===

 All tracks

== 2008 ==

=== Akrobatik - Absolute Value ===

 3. "Put Ya Stamp on It" (featuring Talib Kweli)

=== Guilty Simpson - Ode to the Ghetto ===

 7. "I Must Love You"

=== Wale - The Mixtape About Nothing ===

 13. "The Star" (produced with Questlove and Scott Storch)

=== J Dilla, Ghostface Killah, MF DOOM - Sniperlite CDS ===

 "Sniper Elite" (featuring MF Doom)
 "Murda Goons" (Featuring Ghostface Killah)

=== Q-Tip - The Renaissance ===

 8. "Move"
 14. "Feva"

=== Illa J - Yancey Boys ===

 All tracks (produced with Illa J and Mike Floss)

== 2009 ==

=== DOOM - Born Like This ===

 2. "Gazzillion Ear" (featuring J Dilla)
 7. "Lightworks" (featuring J Dilla)

=== Wiz Khalifa - Flight School ===

 11. "Name on a Cloud"

=== Skyzoo - The Power of Words: The Mixtape ===

 11. "Alphabet Soup"

=== Mos Def - The Ecstatic ===

 15. "History" (featuring Talib Kweli)

=== Raekwon - Only Built 4 Cuban Linx... Pt. II ===

 2. "House of Flying Daggers" (featuring Inspectah Deck, Ghostface Killah and Method Man)
 14. "Ason Jones"
 16. "10 Bricks" (featuring Cappadonna and Ghostface Killah)

== 2010 ==

=== Erykah Badu - New Amerykah Part Two (Return of the Ankh) ===

 7. "Love" (produced with Erykah Badu and Mike Chav)

=== Slum Village - Villa Manifesto ===

 2. "Lock It Down"
 13. "We'll Show You" (featuring AB) (produced with Young RJ)

== 2011 ==

=== Fashawn - Higher Learning Vol. 2 ===

 14. "Closer" (Remix)

== 2012 ==

=== Lil B - The Basedprint II ===

 4. "Dress for the Occasion"

=== Joey Badass - 1999 ===

 11. "Snakes" (featuring T'Nah Apex)
 14. "Where It's At" (featuring Kirk Knight)

=== Smoke DZA - K.O.N.Y. ===

 7. "G.otham F.uckin C.ity" (featuring Joey Badass)

== 2013 ==

=== Yancey Boys - Sunset Blvd. ===

 All tracks

=== Talib Kweli - Gravitas ===

 11. "Colors of You" (featuring Mike Posner)

== 2015 ==

=== Joey Badass - B4.Da.$$ ===

 7. "Like Me" (featuring BJ the Chicago Kid) (produced with The Roots and 1-900)

=== MK Asante - Buck: Original Book Soundtrack ===

 10. "My Victory" (featuring Maya Angelou)

=== Slum Village - Yes! ===

 1. "Intro"
 2. "Fantastic/Love Is" (featuring Bilal and Illa J)
 3. "Tear It Down" (featuring Jon Connor)
 4. "Bonafide" (produced with Young RJ)
 5. "Expressive" (featuring BJ the Chicago Kid, Illa J and Rosewood 2055)
 7. "Windows" (featuring J. Ivy)
 8. "Yes Yes (Remix)" (produced with Young RJ)
 9. "Right Back" (featuring De La Soul) (produced with Young RJ)
 11. "Too Much" (featuring Keely) (produced with Young RJ)
 12. "What We Have" (featuring Kam Corvet and Illa J)

=== Esham - Dichotomy ===

 12. "Birdz Nest"

=== Lupe Fiasco - Pharaoh Height 2/30 ===

 3. "Of"

=== Dreamville - Revenge of the Dreamers II ===

 8. "Still Slummin'" (performed by Lute)

== 2016 ==

=== Freeway - Fear of a Free Planet ===

 7. "Girls"

=== J Dilla - The Diary ===

 1. "The Introduction" (produced with House Shoes)
 2. "The Anthem" (featuring Frank n Dank)
 6. "Trucks"
 9. "Give Them What They Want"
 13. "Fuck the Police"

=== Snoop Dogg - Coolaid ===

 9. "My Carz"

=== Slum Village - Slum Village, Vol. 0 ===

 All tracks

== 2017 ==

=== XXXTENTACION - A Ghetto Christmas Carol ===
 2. "Hate Will Never Win"

== 2019 ==

=== Common - Let Love ===

 2. "HER Love" (featuring Daniel Caesar)

== 2020 ==

=== Busta Rhymes - Extinction Level Event 2: The Wrath of God ===

 3. "Strap Yourself Down" (produced with Pete Rock)

== 2022 ==

=== Phife Dawg - Forever'' 

 4. "Nutshell Pt. 2" (featuring Busta Rhymes and Redman)

Notes

References

Discographies of American artists
Hip hop discographies
Production discographies